GGJ could refer to:

 Georgemas Junction railway station, Scotland
 Goshainganj Railway Station, India
 Global Game Jam, a game developers event
 Governor-General of Jamaica